The Chicago Women's Open is a tennis tournament held in Chicago, Illinois for female professional tennis players, whose first edition was part of the 2021 WTA Tour. It is held on outdoor hard courts one week prior to the US Open.

Results

Singles

Doubles

References

External links
 Official website

Tennis in Chicago